Janusz Radziwiłł is the name of several Polish–Lithuanian nobles:

 Janusz Radziwiłł (1579–1620), castellan of Vilnius and the starost of Borysów
 Janusz Radziwiłł (1612–55), signatory of the Union of Kėdainiai
 Janusz Radziwiłł (1880–1967), conservative politician in the Second Polish Republic